The first elections to Trafford Council were held on Thursday, 10 May 1973. This was a new council created to replace the following authorities: the Municipal Borough of Altrincham, the Municipal Borough of Sale, the Municipal Borough of Stretford, Bowdon Urban District, Hale Urban District, Urmston Urban District, and parts of Bucklow Rural District. This election would create the entire 63-member council (3 councillors to each ward), which would shadow its predecessor councils before taking over their functions on 1 April 1974, as specified in the Local Government Act 1972. Each 1st-placed candidate would serve a five-year term of office, expiring in 1978. Each 2nd-placed candidate would serve a three-year term of office, expiring in 1976. Each 3rd-placed candidate would serve a two-year term of office, expiring in 1975.

The Conservative Party gained overall control of the council.

After the election, the composition of the council was as follows:

Ward results
Detailed below are the three successful candidates for each ward, with number of votes received.

References

1973 English local elections
1973
20th century in Cheshire
1970s in Lancashire